Theresa Maria Coriolano (1620–1671) was an Italian engraver of the Baroque period.

Coriolano was born in Bologna, the daughter of the engraver Bartolommeo Coriolano, and was instructed in painting by Elisabetta Sirani. She etched a small plate of the Virgin, half-length, with the Infant Jesus.

References

External links
 Page at Art Renewal Centre Museum

1620 births
1671 deaths
Artists from Bologna
Italian engravers
17th-century Italian women artists
Women engravers
Catholic engravers
Female Catholic artists